Carex bicknellii, known as Bicknell's sedge and copper-shouldered oval sedge, is a species of sedge native to North America. Carex bicknellii grows in small clumps with fewer than 25 flowering stems per clump. It is found in mesic to dry prairies, savannas, and open woodlands.

References

bicknellii
Plants described in 1896
Flora of North America